Ecnomoneura is a monotypic snout moth genus described by Alfred Jefferis Turner in 1942. Its single species, described in the same publication, Ecnomoneura sphaerotropha, is found in Australia.

References

Phycitini
Monotypic moth genera
Moths of Australia
Pyralidae genera